Telesni čuvaj  is a novel by Slovenian author Miha Mazzini. It was first published in 2000 and translated in English as Guarding Hanna.

See also
List of Slovenian novels

Slovenian novels
2000 novels

sl:Telesni čuvaj (roman)